The UANL High School System consists of 29 schools in Nuevo León affiliated with the Autonomous University of Nuevo León (Spanish: Universidad Autónoma de Nuevo León, UANL) The high schools have several programs such as the propedeutic baccalaureate, bilingual program, bivalent program in bilingual education, binational program in bilingual education, technical program, and the University Superior Technician degree. Three schools offer technical education, and one school, CIDEB, offers the International Baccalaureate Diploma Programme. Fifteen schools are in the metropolitan area of Monterrey.

History
On May 31, 1933 with the rise of the UANL the Escuela de Bachilleres was established in the Colegio Civil. At that time the Colegio Civil was also used by a law school. Later in 1939, the Nocturn School for Workers (now Preparatoria 3) was founded.

In 1955 the Escuela de Bachilleres was divided into three: Preparatoria 1 in the Colegio Civil, Preparatoria 2 in the neighborhood Mitras, and Preparatoria 3 Nocturn School in the Colegio Civil. Also was renamed the Preparatoria 4 in Linares.

The Escuela de Artes y Labores Pablo Livas was founded in 1921 by Anastasio A. Treviño Martínez. In 1933 it was incorporated to UANL. The Pablo Livas was a girls' school till 1974 when it became co-educational.

The Escuela Industrial Alvaro Obregón was founded in 1930 by Aarón Saénz Garza and was incorporated in 1933 in the UANL. The EIAO had the building in the center of Monterrey and offered mechanical and industrial courses.

Carlos Torres González, principal of Preparatoria 22 in Ciudad Guadalupe, died after being shot and least six times on July 14, 2017. It is unclear if this was a robbery attempt or a targeted murder.

Schools

Propedeutic Baccalaurate

Technical School

References

Education in Nuevo León
Schools in Mexico
1933 establishments in Mexico